Hernán Cattáneo (born 4 March 1965) is an Argentine house DJ.  He produces electronic music, mostly progressive house.

Musical career 

Cattáneo began his professional career playing in the early 1990s for FM Z95, a local radio station largely responsible for the diffusion of electronic dance music in Argentina.

In 1996, he won the residency at Clubland Pacha in Buenos Aires. Sometime during his residency, renowned DJ Paul Oakenfold came to perform at Pacha while on tour. Paul was so impressed with his craft, that he asked Hernan to open for him on his tours globally. This exposed him to an international crowd that he otherwise may not have reached outside of Argentina. Shortly thereafter, he signed to Paul Oakenfold's Perfecto Records, which later led him to become a Cream resident in Liverpool, England and Ibiza, Spain.

He has played at Creamfields, Exit and Refresh Festival.  As a DJ he rose to No. 22 and then to No. 6 on the DJ Mag poll of the Top 100 DJs. Cattáneo's musical style has remained true to form, eschewing overly commercial/pop sounds in order to maintain a broad and enduring appeal within progressive house circles globally.

In May 2007, he released Sequential Volume 2, which was once again followed by another worldwide tour to promote the compilation.

Discography

Compilations

Singles

Remixes

See also

List of DJ Awards winners and nominees
List of house music artists
List of progressive house artists

References

External links
 HernanCattaneo.com

People from Buenos Aires
Argentine DJs
Club DJs
Living people
1965 births
Progressive house musicians